The Naypyidaw Development Committee (abbreviated NPTDC) is the administrative body of Naypyidaw, the administrative capital of Myanmar (Burma). NPTDC is separate from the Naypyidaw Council.

History

NPTDC was established by the State Peace and Development Council, under the Nay Pyi Taw Development Law, which was issued on 29 December 2009. Consisting of 5 to 9 members, it is led by a Chairman who acts as the Mayor, and a Vice-Chairman who acts as the Vice-Mayor.

See also
Naypyidaw
Mandalay City Development Committee
Yangon City Development Committee
Myanmar International Convention Centre 2

References

External links
Official website

Government agencies of Myanmar
Naypyidaw